Weymeria is a monotypic moth genus of the family Noctuidae erected by Ferdinand Karsch in 1895. Its only species, Weymeria athene, was first described by Weymer in 1892. It is found in Tanzania.

References

Agaristinae
Monotypic moth genera